Ohio History Connection, formerly The Ohio State Archaeological and Historical Society and Ohio Historical Society, is a nonprofit organization incorporated in 1885. Headquartered at the Ohio History Center in Columbus, Ohio, Ohio History Connection provides services to both preserve and share Ohio's history, including its prehistory, and manages over 50 museums and sites across the state. An early iteration of the organization was founded by Brigadier General Roeliff Brinkerhoff in 1875. Over its history, the organization changed its name twice, with the first occurring in 1954 when the name was shortened to Ohio Historical Society. In 2014, it was changed again to Ohio History Connection, in what members believed was a more modern and welcoming representation of the organization's image.

History

In its early history, Ohioans made several attempts to establish a formal historical society. On February 1, 1822, the Ohio General Assembly passed legislation creating the Historical Society of Ohio. Well-known Ohio political leaders at the time, Jeremiah Morrow and Duncan McArthur, were members. The society's formation was brief, however, as it held only one meeting. The state legislature made another attempt in 1831, when it authorized Benjamin Tappan to form its replacement. He established the Historical and Philosophical Society of Ohio, which met regularly in Columbus. Participation declined sharply following the Panic of 1837, and the organization decided to move to Cincinnati in 1848 in hopes that the city's larger population would help revive interest. The decision led to a period of prosperity for the organization, and it worked closely with the Cincinnati Historical Society for many years.

In 1875, a new organization called the Archaeological Society was founded in the home of Brigadier General Roeliff Brinkerhoff in Mansfield, Ohio. The Ohio state legislature had procured $2,500 in funds, at the request of General Brinkerhoff, to finance the creation of an exhibit for the upcoming Centennial International Exhibition of 1876 in Philadelphia. The society was active until 1883 when its secretary, Professor John T. Short of the Ohio State University, died. It was revived two years later at the request of Governor George Hoadly, who organized two meetings in the state's capital with scholars and professors from around the state. Sixty men attended the second meeting which had sessions spanning two days. On March 13, 1885, the Ohio State Archaeological and Historical Society was officially incorporated. Allen G. Thurman was elected its first president.

The state government began appropriating funds to assist the private organization in 1888. This led to a closer partnership with the state, in which the government was permitted to appoint six of the fifteen members serving in the board of trustees. It also led to the organization being granted oversight responsibilities for historical sites across Ohio, beginning with Fort Ancient State Memorial in 1891.

The Ohio State Archaeological and Historical Society was originally headquartered at the Ohio Statehouse but later moved to Ohio State University's Orton Hall in 1894. On May 30, 1914, the organization dedicated the Ohio State Archaeological and Historical Society Building, a large museum building by Orton Hall. The society stayed at the building until 1970, when the facility became part of OSU and was renamed Sullivant Hall.

In 1954, the organization's name was shortened to Ohio Historical Society. It was changed again to the Ohio History Connection in 2014, after research suggested that "society" carried a negative connotation. The organization's image as a whole was perceived as "exclusive, inaccessible and antiquated", and the rebranding was an attempt to better reflect the organization's mission from a modern perspective and appeal more inviting to the state's citizens. The change was also part of a national trend that saw historical societies across the United States drop "society" from their title.

The organization began reaching out to federally recognized tribal nations in 2009, in an effort to incorporate Native American perspectives.  the Ohio History Connection manages 58 museums and historical sites across Ohio, spanning 40 of the state's 88 counties. This includes approximately 1.6 million artifacts,  of stored records, and 250,000 images. Also from 2010 to 2014, membership of the nonprofit organization increased more than 20 percent to a total of 7,563.

Ohio History Center

The Ohio History Connection operates dozens of state historic sites across Ohio. Its headquarters is the 250,000-square-foot (23,000 m2) Ohio History Center in Columbus, Ohio, a Brutalist concrete structure. Extensive exhibits cover Ohio's history from the Ice Age to the present. The Center includes state archives and library spaces, a gift shop, and administrative and educational facilities. The 1989 Smithsonian Guide to Historic America described the center as "probably the finest museum in America devoted to pre-European history."

The society's first permanent home was in Sullivant Hall on the Ohio State University campus. The society operated a museum and library there. Later, the archives moved to the Old Governor's Mansion on Broad Street. In 1965, voters approved a bond for a new structure to be built. W. Byron Ireland designed a Brutalist building with post-tensioned concrete structures, allowing for a cantilevered design. The building remains mostly as built, including its exterior use of silo tiles made in Ohio.

Ohio Village

Ohio Village, a reconstructed 1890s-era town, is a living museum area of the Ohio History Center campus. In 2002, budget cuts forced the Ohio Village to close except for special events, school and tour groups. In the summer of 2012, it reopened to the public, relying on volunteers instead of paid staffing, who purchase their own costumes and dedicate at least 16 hours of work per season. The Ohio Village attempts to "animate history" in the sense of taking what is perceived as one-dimensional and converting it into three dimensions, with the volunteers portraying characters that represent people who truly existed during the mid-to-late 19th century. It is open to the public from Memorial Day weekend through Labor Day weekend and for special events such as All Hallows Eve and Dickens of a Christmas.

The village houses home games for the Ohio Village Muffins, a vintage base ball club formed in 1981 that competes each year against other vintage teams from Ohio and around the country. The team's name is derived from the phrase muff, a term often used during the era to refer to an "error". A team's third string was typically labeled the "muffin nine". The Ohio Village Muffins promote the preservation of the game as it was played in 1860, using underhanded pitching, foregoing the use of gloves, and wearing uniforms that match the time period. Ohio Village also hosts a women's team called The Diamonds. A league for women, as teams formed at colleges across the country, began in 1866.

Ohio History Connection resources
The Ohio History Connection also provides educators with resources for the state's schools. Field trips, outreach programs, and educational kit trunks are available to assist teachers with supplemental learning in their classrooms. Also offered are distance learning courses. Affiliated with the Ohio History Connection is the Ohio Educational Resources Center, which loans materials to assist teachers with their lessons. The society also provides public programs that include speakers, theatrical productions, conferences, workshops, holiday gatherings, and presentations. The topics of these programs range from the Underground Railroad to the role of the state in other historical events.

The Ohio History Connection publishes Ohio History Central, an extensive online encyclopedia of Ohio history. Ohio History Central consists of over 3,000 entries about Ohio's natural history, prehistory, and history. The entries are complemented by nearly 2,000 images. The site is fully searchable, and users may browse entries by category, topic, media, time period, or geographic region within the state. Special features include image galleries, Ohio Quick Facts, Ohio Across Time (a timeline of events that occurred in Ohio or that impacted Ohio's history), and Useful Links (to Ohio History Connection websites; Ohio county and local history websites; and other state, municipal, and regional encyclopedias). Registered users can also create personal scrapbooks using any of the encyclopedia's entries and images.

The Ohio History Connection maintains an online archive of Ohio History, a peer reviewed scholarly journal first published by the society in 1887, and since 2007 by the Kent State University Press.

Sites by region
The Ohio History Connection operates a statewide network of historical, archaeological and natural history sites. Admission is free for members. In some cases, the Ohio History Connection has contracted with other organizations for management (viz. Serpent Mound)

Northeast
 Custer Memorial, New Rumley
 Fort Laurens, Bolivar
 McCook House, Carrollton
 Museum of Ceramics, East Liverpool
 Quaker Meeting House, Mount Pleasant
 Schoenbrunn Village, New Philadelphia
 Shaker Historical Museum, Shaker Heights
 Tallmadge Church, Tallmadge
 Youngstown Historical Center, Youngstown
 Zoar Village, Zoar

Northwest
 Neil Armstrong Air and Space Museum, Wapakoneta
 Cedar Bog, Urbana
 Cooke House, Sandusky
 Fallen Timbers, Toledo
 Fort Amanda, Lima
 Fort Meigs, Perrysburg
 Fort Recovery
 Glacial Grooves State Memorial, Kelleys Island
 Hayes Presidential Center, Fremont
 Indian Mill Museum, Upper Sandusky
 Inscription Rock, Kelleys Island
 Lockington Locks
 Piqua Historical Area

Central
 Flint Ridge State Memorial
 Hanby House
 Harding Home
 Harding Tomb
 Logan Elm
 Newark Earthworks: Great Circle Earthworks
 Newark Earthworks: Octagon Earthworks
 Newark Earthworks: Wright Earthworks
 Ohio History Center
 Ohio Village
 Shrum Mound
 Wahkeena Preserve

Southwest
 Adena Mansion
 Davis Memorial
 Dunbar House
 Fort Ancient
 Fort Jefferson
 Fort Hill State Memorial
 Grant Birthplace
 Grant Boyhood Home
 Grant Schoolhouse
 Harrison Tomb
 Miamisburg Mound
 National Afro-American Museum & Cultural Center
 Rankin House
 Serpent Mound
 Story Mound
 Stowe House

Southeast
 Big Bottom, Stockport
 Buckeye Furnace, Wellston
 Buffington Island
 Campus Martius, Marietta
 Leo Petroglyph
 McCook Monument
 National Road/Zane Grey Museum, New Concord
 Ohio River Museum, Marietta
 Our House

See also 
 History of Ohio
 Columbus Historical Society

References

External links
 

 
 Ohio Historical Marker Program
 Ohio History Central: An Online Encyclopedia of Ohio History

 
Organizations established in 1885
1885 establishments in Ohio
History of Ohio
State historical societies of the United States
History of Columbus, Ohio
Museum organizations
Historical societies in Ohio
Museums in Columbus, Ohio